Wolfhole Crag is a lonely and seldom-visited hill in the Forest of Bowland in Lancashire, England. Its seclusion is due in part to its low profile and long approach walks.  A long path approaches from Ward's Stone in the west which is fraught with bogs. Another tarmac path from Tarnbrook meets this half way. A final path comes from the north east from the Hornby Road in the direction to White Hill. The summit consists of two large (10m high) buttresses of gritstone some unusually shaped waist-high rocks and the usual trig point. The buttresses contain a number of recorded rock climbs, including the two farthest "hard grit" routes (E7 & E6) from the road in the entire UK. Both climbs were ascended in 2001 by Neil Kershaw and Greg Chapman. It's quite possible to not see another human being all day there.
The East crag has a 'Wolf hole' at the base of the south facing side, presumably how it originally gained the name.
Wolfhole Crag marks the northwesternmost boundary of the civil parish of Bowland Forest High, the historic Forest of Bowland as well as the Lordship of Bowland.

Hills of the Forest of Bowland
Mountains and hills of Lancashire
Geography of Ribble Valley
Geography of the City of Lancaster